Académica de Ingoré is a Guinea-Bissauan football club based in Ingoré (Bigene Sector). The club most recently played in the first division in Guinean football, the Campeonato Nacional da Guiné-Bissau, during the 2013 season.

References

Academica De Ingore